Kalimba may refer to:

Kalimba, an African plucked idiophone.
Kalimba (video game), a video game for the Xbox One released in 2014 by Danish developer Press Play
Kalimba Music, an American record label
"Kalimba Story", 1974 song by Earth, Wind & Fire
"Kalimba", a song by electronica artist Mr. Scruff on the 2008 album Ninja Tuna.

People
Kalimba is a given name. It may refer to:
Kalimba Edwards (born 1979), American Football player
Kalimba (singer) or Kalimba Marichal (born 1982), Mexican singer